The 2013–14 season was the 86th season in Real Valladolid ’s history and the 42nd in the top-tier.

Squad
As June, 2014..

Squad and statistics

|}

Transfers

Competitions

Overall

La Liga

Copa del Rey

References

Real Valladolid seasons
Valladolid